The Eternal Jew is the title of a book published in 1937 by Franz Eher Nachfolger, the publishing house of the German Nazi Party (NSDAP). It comprises 267 photographs each with a short caption denigrating Jewish people.

See also 

 The International Jew

References

Antisemitic publications
1937 non-fiction books